Hartog Hamburger (Amsterdam, March 20, 1887 - Amsterdam, October 10, 1924) was a Dutch diamond polisher and baseball player.

Hamburger played as an infielder for OVVO in Amsterdam, which belonged to the highest division of Dutch baseball, the Hoofdklasse. During a game on October 9, 1924 he was hit on the head by a line drive. He became dizzy but seemed to recover. However, the next day he died at his home as a result of the impact. He is thought to be the only European baseball player who died as the result of playing a baseball game. Hamburger's son, psychiatrist Max Hamburger, was a Jewish resistance fighter and Holocaust survivor.

See also
 List of baseball players who died during their careers

References

1887 births
1924 deaths
Dutch baseball players
Jewish baseball players
Jewish Dutch sportspeople
Sportspeople from Amsterdam
Sport deaths in the Netherlands
Baseball deaths